Communications in the Cayman Islands

Telephone 

Telephones – main lines in use: 37,400 (2009) 

Telephones – mobile cellular: 99,900 (2004)

Telephone system:
Domestic: Reasonably good overall telephone system with a high fixed-line teledensity. Liberalization of telecom market in 2003; introduction of competition in the mobile-cellular market in 2004.  FLOW Cayman, Digicel
 International: The Cayman Islands have landing points for the MAYA-1, and the Cayman-Jamaica Fiber System submarine cables that provide links to the US and parts of Central and South America. Service on both of these cables are controlled by Liberty Latin America.

Satellite earth station – 1 Intelsat (Atlantic Ocean) (2007) Intelsat (Atlantic Ocean)

Radio 
Radio broadcast stations: AM 0, FM 17, shortwave 0 (2006)
 List of radio stations in Cayman Islands

Radios: 36,000 (1997)

Television 

Television broadcast stations: Cayman27

Internet 

Internet Service Providers (ISPs):Four companies offer internet service in the islands with in fixed configurations or mobile or both:
 Liberty Latin America d/b/a FLOW
 Digicel
 Logic - Fibre based service. Founded in 2004 as WestTel when it was granted a telecommunications license. Purchased TeleCayman in 2013
 C3

Country code (Top-level domain): .ky

References 

Cayman Islands
 
Cayman